In Winds, In Light is an album by Swedish bassist and composer Anders Jormin recorded in 2003 and released on the ECM label.

Reception
The Allmusic review by Thom Jurek awarded the album 4 stars stating "This is a startling record, literally unlike anything ever heard before. These players make wonderful use of space and dynamic, and the manner in which they interact is as one... This record may not be for everyone, but it is surprisingly accessible and has literally no new age connotations. This is music that may approximate the harmony of the spheres, but it does so from the ground -- from the heart of the heart of the matter -- up".

Track listing
All compositions by Anders Jormin except as indicated
 "Vårstäv (Spring Saying)" - 1:09 
 "Introitus" - 1:36 
 "Sång 80 (Song 80)" (Anders Jormin, Harry Martinson) - 6:08 
 "Choral" - 8:27 
 "In Winds" - 3:01 
 "Sandstone" - 2:01 
 "Allt" (Lotta Olsson-Anderberg, Jormin) - 6:36 
 "Soapstone" - 2:09 
 "Gryning (Dawn)" - 3:30 
 "Each Man" (William Blake, Jormin) - 0:53 
 "Transition" - 1:08 
 "Flying" - 3:09 
 "Sommarorgel (Summer Organ)" (Johannes Edfelt, Jormin) - 4:48 
 "Love Song" - 6:33 
 "Limestone" - 1:26 
 "En Gång (Some Day)" (Jormin, Pär Lagerkvist) - 8:49
Recorded in the Organ Hall of the Musikhögskolan in Götenberg, Sweden in May 2003

Personnel
Anders Jormin — bass
Lena Willemark — voice
Marilyn Crispell — piano
Karin Nelson — church organ
Raymond Strid — percussion

References

ECM Records albums
Anders Jormin albums
2004 albums
Albums produced by Manfred Eicher